"In the Club" is an English language song by Swedish singer Danny Saucedo. The song is written by Figge Boström, Peter Boström and Saucedo himself. Saucedo participated in Melodifestivalen 2011, singing the song, in a bid to represent Sweden in the Eurovision Song Contest 2011 in Düsseldorf, Germany.

After finishing first in the first of four semi-finals that was held on 5 February 2011 in Coop Norrbotten Arena, Luleå, he qualified for the Melodifestivalen finals as one of ten songs chosen. The final was held on 12 March 2011 at the Ericsson Globe Arena in Stockholm and Saucedo came only second in votes to the winning song "Popular" by Eric Saade. Danny garnered 149 points to Saade's 193 points.

The single was released one week before the Melodifestivalen 2011 final and went in straight to number two on the Sverigetopplistan, the official Swedish Singles Chart on the chart dated 11 March 2011.

During a pause at Melodifestivalen 2013, the song was performed by Ann-Louise Hanson, Towa Carson and Siw Malmkvist as Bingohall. It was also released on an EP the same year.

Charts

Weekly charts

Year-end charts

References

2011 songs
2011 singles
Melodifestivalen songs of 2011
Songs written by Figge Boström
Songs written by Peter Boström
Songs written by Danny Saucedo
Sony Music singles
Danny Saucedo songs
Ann-Louise Hanson songs
Siw Malmkvist songs
Towa Carson songs